Air Chief Marshal (Ret.) Omar Dhani (23 January 1924 – 24 July 2009) was commander of the Indonesian Air Force (TNI-AU) from 1962 until 1965. He was a leading leftist figure in Indonesia during the Sukarno era.

Early life and career
Dhani first worked on a plantation, then at the government radio station, in the ministry of information, and then in a bank. He enrolled in the Air Force Academy in 1950, and in 1956, attended the Royal Air Force Staff College, Andover in Great Britain. He rose through the ranks to become Minister and Commander of the Air Force in January 1962, succeeded Soerjadi Soerjadarma after the latter was accused of not providing air support during the Battle of Arafura Sea.

He was appointed as the commander of the Korps Siaga, later Korps Mandala Siaga (KOLAGA) during the 1963-1965 Indonesia-Malaysia Confrontation, where he commanded three brigades.

Imprisonment and eventual release
His support for Sukarno, and his apparent support for the 30 September Movement in 1965 was his undoing. For example, he had issued comments in support of the movement on the front page of the leftist daily Warta Bhakti. Shortly after the downfall of President Sukarno, he was arrested and sent to prison by the new government led by Soeharto.

In 1995, at age 71, he was legally pardoned on the order of Suharto, along with Soebandrio and Soetarto, two other longtime political prisoners. The date of their release was timed to occur the day before the fiftieth anniversary of Indonesian independence. This was apparently a humanitarian gesture aiming to make the Suharto regime open to reform; what those three political prisoners also had in common was that they were never officially members of the Indonesian Communist Party. Nonetheless, the release was insisted upon by Suharto against the wishes of the Armed Forces. Upon his release from jail Dhani became one of the main sources for research into the Air Force's role during the 1965 coup. He died on 24 July 2009, at the age of 85. He is buried at Jeruk Purut Cemetery in South Jakarta.

References

|-
 

1924 births
2009 deaths
People from Surakarta
Indonesian politicians
Indonesian prisoners and detainees
Indonesian Air Force air marshals
Prisoners and detainees of Indonesia
Recipients of Indonesian presidential pardons
Chiefs of Staff of the Indonesian Air Force